Tanja Jacobs is a Belgian-born Canadian actress and theatre director. She originated the role of Constance Ledbelly in Anne-Marie MacDonald's Goodnight Desdemona (Good Morning Juliet).

Early life 
Jacobs was born in Belgium to German parents. Her mother, Katia Jacobs, was a visual artist. At age 5, following the collapse of her parents' marriage, she, her mother, and older brother relocated to Canada. Katia Jacobs would later remarry Bill Kennedy, who Tanja considers to be her father. Jacobs says she knew she wanted to be an actress at age 9. At age 16, Jacobs left high school. She began taking acting classes at age 18.

Career 
At age 22, Jacobs landed her first notable role playing Dr. Chebutykin in an all-female production of Chekhov's Three Sisters.

In the 1980s, Jacobs was a member of the Toronto theatre company, Autumn Angel. Other company members were Richard Rose, Thom Sokoloski, Maggie Huculak, Stewart Arnott, Kim Renders, Bruce Vavrina and Mark Christmann.

In 1987, landed the role of Skinner in Howard Baker's The Castle. The production marked a turning point in Jacobs' career; after that performance, she worked almost constantly.

Jacobs originated the role of Constance Ledbelly in Ann-Marie MacDonald's Goodnight Desdemona (Good Morning Juliet) in 1988. Jacobs was nominated for a Dora Mavor Moore Award for her performance.

Personal life 
Jacobs has a daughter, Nina, who was born in 1998. Following Nina's birth, Jacobs took a break from her career to be a stay-at-home mother. In 2018, Jacobs completed her MFA in Stage Direction at York University.

Filmography 
Television

Film

Theatre credits 
As director:

As actor:

Awards

Notes

References

External links 

 

Canadian stage actresses
Canadian theatre directors
Canadian television actresses
York University alumni
Women theatre directors
Canadian people of German descent
Belgian emigrants to Canada
Date of birth missing (living people)
Living people
21st-century Canadian actresses
20th-century Canadian actresses
Year of birth missing (living people)